The Chelmsford and Mid Essex Times, formerly the 'Chelmsford Weekly News', is a weekly newspaper covering the Chelmsford and central area of Essex. The re-branded edition was launched on 22 June 2017.

References

Newspapers published in Essex
Weekly newspapers published in the United Kingdom
Publications established in 1862